Cirrhochrista trilinealis is a moth in the family Crambidae. It is found in Papua New Guinea.

References

Moths described in 1900
Spilomelinae
Moths of New Guinea